William O. Stephens (born 10 June 1962), is an American philosopher and scholar of Stoicism. He is Professor Emeritus of Philosophy at Creighton University after retiring from teaching at their Omaha Campus in 2020.

Biography

Stephens was born in Lafayette, Indiana and grew up in West Lafayette where he attended West Lafayette Senior High School and began his study of ancient civilizations and Latin. He studied Philosophy at the College of Wooster for two years before transferring to Earlham College, where he earned his undergraduate degree. Stephens completed his graduate work at the University of Pennsylvania, studying under Charles H. Kahn, Alexander Nehamas, and Martin Ostwald. He received his doctorate in Philosophy in 1990.

In August 1990, he joined the faculty at Creighton University where he received the Omicron Delta Kappa Teaching for Tomorrow award in 2005. During his tenure at Creighton, Stephens published four books and numerous articles on topics including Stoic ethics, Epicureanism, philosophical vegetarianism, personhood, and sex and love. He has also written on being a Stoic and a Chicago Cubs fan, and on the similarities the Jedi philosophy in Star Wars shares with Stoicism. He presented on phobias, terrorism, and Stoic fearlessness at Stoicon in Toronto, Canada, October 14, 2017, and on a Stoic approach to travel and tourism at Stoicon in London, England, September 29, 2018. He is frequently interviewed about topics in Stoicism.

Vegetarianism

Stephens authored an influential paper examining five arguments for vegetarianism. These were the arguments from distributive justice, environmental harm, sexual politics, moral consideration for animals, and the prudential argument from health. He concluded that compassion, humility, and integrity make working toward a meatless diet virtuous.

Selected publications
Books

 Marcus Aurelius: A Guide for the Perplexed. London: Continuum, 2012. .
 Stoic Ethics: Epictetus and Happiness as Freedom. London: Continuum, 2007. .
 The Person: Readings in Human Nature. Upper Saddle River, NJ: Pearson, 2006. .
 The Ethics of the Stoic Epictetus, An English Translation, Revised Edition, William O. Stephens, New York: Peter Lang, 2021. .

Papers

Five Arguments for Vegetarianism (Philosophy in the Contemporary World, 1994)
Fake Meat (Encyclopedia of Food and Agricultural Ethics, 2018)
Public Health, Ethical Vegetarianism, and the Harms of the Animal Food Industry (Archives in Biomedical Engineering & Biotechnology, 2019)

See also
 List of animal rights advocates

References 

1962 births
Living people
American animal rights scholars
American philosophers
American vegetarianism activists
College of Wooster alumni
Creighton University faculty
Earlham College alumni
People from Lafayette, Indiana
University of Pennsylvania alumni